Disney's Beauty and the Beast Magical Ballroom is a 2000 video game which is part of Disney's Beauty and the Beast media franchise.

Development
This game and Disney’s The Little Mermaid II: Return to the Sea were designed to "combin[e] girls’ creative interests with their natural play patterns".

Gameplay and plot
The game contains a collection of mini-games for children based around the characters of the Disney animated movie Beauty and the Beast. Software and CD Rom explains "The premise, from which the program's activities are derived, involves a party that Belle and her friends are throwing for Beast."

Critical reception
SuperKids said that the game "offers the same enchanting theme and endearing characters we loved" in the film that served as the game's inspiration, commending its "creativity and problem solving activities" as "well-planned and enjoyable", while criticising its difficulty and lack of a developed storyline. Strange Little Games said it was suitable for children and fans of the franchise.

References

2000 video games
Beauty and the Beast (franchise) video games
Video games based on films
Video games based on adaptations
Video games developed in the United States
Video games set in France
Windows games
Windows-only games